Josie Rourke (born 3 September 1976) is an English theatre and film director. She is a Vice-President of the London Library and was the artistic director of the Donmar Warehouse theatre from 2012 to 2019. In 2018, she made her feature film debut with the Academy Award and BAFTA-nominated historical drama Mary Queen of Scots, starring Saoirse Ronan and Margot Robbie.

Early life and education
Rourke was born in 1976 in Salford, Greater Manchester, to Vivienne and Sean Rourke. She has one brother, Damian. She attended St Mary's RC Primary School, Swinton, St Gilbert's RC Primary School, Winton, St Patrick's RC Secondary School, Eccles, and Eccles College of Further Education.

She was the first person in the history of her school to attend Cambridge University, where she studied English at New Hall, now Murray Edwards College. She began directing for theatre at Cambridge and, amongst other credits, was the first woman in history to direct the Footlights Pantomime, which was co-written by Footlights President and Vice President Richard Ayoade and John Oliver.

Career

Training 
Upon graduating from Cambridge in 1998, she worked for Cambridge Arts Theatre, co-ordinating the BT National Connections project around East Anglia. She then moved to London, where she worked nights as a secretary for a mergers and acquisitions bank, pursuing theatre projects during the days, including assisting Laurie Sansom on a production of J.B. Priestley's Dangerous Corner (1999) at Watford Palace Theatre.

After nine months of living and working in London, she was appointed Resident Assistant Director at the Donmar Warehouse. Sam Mendes was then the Artistic Director. Over her year-long traineeship, she assisted Michael Grandage on Peter Nichols' Passion Play (2000) and Merrily We Roll Along (2000–2001), Nicholas Hytner on Orpheus Descending (2000), starring Helen Mirren, Sam Mendes on Nick Whitby's To the Green Fields Beyond (2000) and Phyllida Lloyd on David Mamet's Boston Marriage (2001), starring Zoë Wanamaker.

Following her twelve months at the Donmar, Sam Mendes asked her to direct Frame 312 (2002) on its stage, and Michael Grandage invited Rourke to Sheffield to direct Kick for Touch (2002) as part of the Peter Gill Festival at Sheffield Theatres. While preparing those productions, Rourke assisted Peter Gill on his own play, The York Realist (2001), and John Osborne's Luther (2001) on the Olivier stage of the National Theatre.

Early directing career 
For the next five years, Rourke freelanced at a number of theatres, while being resident at the Royal Court in London and Associate Director of Sheffield Theatres.

While resident at the Royal Court Theatre, under Artistic Director Ian Rickson, she programmed readings, developed new work and directed Crazyblackmuthafuckin'self (2003) in the Theatre Upstairs at the Royal Court and Loyal Women (2003) in the Theatre Downstairs. Her productions for Sheffield Theatres during this time were on the Lyceum, Crucible and Studio stages and included Much Ado About Nothing (2005) and Willis Hall's The Long and the Short and the Tall (2006). Her production of Steve Waters' play World Music (2003) transferred from Sheffield to the Donmar stage. During this period, Rourke was also the UK tour director of Eve Ensler's The Vagina Monologues (2003).

She also directed for the Royal Shakespeare Company in the 2005 Gunpowder Season, Believe What You Will by Philip Massinger and, as part of the 2006 Complete Works Festival, King John by William Shakespeare, starring Richard McCabe, Joseph Millson and Tamsin Greig. She returned to the Donmar to direct a production of David Mamet's The Cryptogram (2006), which starred Kim Cattrall and Douglas Henshall.

Artistic directorship

Bush Theatre (2007–2011) 
In 2007, Rourke was appointed Artistic Director of the Bush Theatre, one of the country's key venues for new plays and playwrights. During her time at The Bush, she programmed the first plays and early work of, amongst other writers: James Graham, Nancy Harris, Lucy Kirkwood, Nick Payne, Penelope Skinner, Jack Thorne, Steve Waters, Anthony Weigh and Tom Wells.
Shortly after she was appointed, the Bush Theatre was the target of a proposed cut in funding by Arts Council England. Rourke made a Freedom of Information Act request which established that the proposed cut had been made using flawed evidence and data. The Arts Council reinstated the theatre's funding but gave Rourke three years in which to find a new home for the Bush Theatre. In 2011, the Bush Theatre opened in new premises in a former library building, winning Theatre of the Year.

The new home for The Bush opened with Sixty-Six Books (2011), a 24-hour performance cycle with 66 writers and 144 actors that Rourke co-directed with a dozen of her peers. The cycle went on to be performed overnight in Westminster Abbey.

During her time at The Bush, Rourke continued to work as a freelance director. Her projects included Twelfth Night (2009) and The Taming of The Shrew (2010) for Chicago Shakespeare Theater, Men Should Weep (2010–2011) by Ena Lamont Stewart at the National Theatre and Much Ado About Nothing (2011) for Sonia Friedman Productions at the Wyndham's Theatre, starring David Tennant and Catherine Tate, the onstage reunion of which won the WhatsOnStage Award for the Theatre Event of the Year.

Donmar Warehouse (2012–2019) 
In 2011, Rourke was appointed Artistic Director of the Donmar Warehouse,  the first woman to hold the role and the first female theatre director to be appointed the artistic director of a major London theatre.

As Artistic Director, she was responsible for programming the work of, amongst other directors: Phyllida Lloyd, who directed her all-female Shakespeare Trilogy at the Donmar; Kwame Kwei-Armah; Lyndsey Turner, whose celebrated revivals of Brian Friel's work have been a significant part of the Donmar's programme; Polly Findlay; Blanche McIntyre; John Crowley; Joe Wright and Robert Hastie.

Her first production at the Donmar was The Recruiting Officer (2012), beginning a working relationship with actor and writer Mark Gatiss, who would go on to star in Coriolanus (also starring Tom Hiddleston) and The Vote at the Donmar. Other notable productions at the Donmar include: Saint Joan (2017) with Gemma Arterton; Berenice (2012) with Anne-Marie Duff; Conor McPherson's The Weir (2013); which transferred to the West-End; Nick Payne's new play Elegy, starring Zoë Wanamaker, Barbara Flynn and Nina Sosanya; the innovative and campaigning Privacy (2014) by James Graham; The Machine (2013) by Matt Charman; the musical City of Angels (2014) by Cy Coleman, Larry Gelbart and David Zippel, which won an Olivier Award; Les Liaisons Dangereuses (2015) with Janet McTeer, Elaine Cassidy and Dominic West at the Donmar and McTeer, Birgitte Hjort Sørensen and Liev Schreiber on Broadway; and also the BAFTA-nominated play for theatre and television, The Vote (2015), which was broadcast live onto television on the night of the general election. The broadcast starred Judi Dench, Mark Gatiss, Catherine Tate and Nina Sosanya and garnered the highest annual viewing figures for the channel in that slot.

From the Donmar, The Weir transferred to the West End, The Machine transferred from the Manchester International Festival to the Park Avenue Armory in New York, Les Liaisons Dangereuses to Broadway and Privacy was reconceived in a US version at The Public Theater with Daniel Radcliffe playing the leading role.

A number of Rourke's productions, including Coriolanus, Les Liaisons Dangereuses and Saint Joan, were broadcast in cinemas in the UK and internationally as part of the National Theatre Live programme.

Film and television 

Rourke made her film debut with Working Title's Mary Queen of Scots. The film starred Saoirse Ronan as Mary, Queen of Scots and Margot Robbie as Elizabeth I.  It premiered on 15 November 2018 at the AFI Fest and later received three nominations at the 72nd British Academy Film Awards, and two nominations, for Best Costume Design and Best Makeup and Hairstyling, at the 91st Academy Awards.

In early 2019, it was first announced that she would direct Catherine Tate's feature film, The Nan Movie, about her popular old-lady character from the BBC sketch series The Catherine Tate Show. In September, Rourke made an Instagram post, saying, "I think I speak for loads of us when I say that my Gran's spirit lives in Catherine Tate's immortal Nan. I have loved working with Catherine over the years on stage, and it is a massive treat to put her Nan on film." After initial filming, the film was substantially retooled. It largely took place in 1940s London, but those scenes were reportedly scaled back and new footage, greatly expanding the modern-day road trip sections, was filmed without Rourke at a low cost, with animation sequences used to fill any gaps. The film was scheduled to be released in June 2020, but was indefinitely postponed due to cinemas being closed because of the COVID-19 pandemic. The Nan Movie was eventually released on 18 March 2022, with Rourke receiving an executive producer credit and no director credited.

During the 2020 lockdown, she directed the episode "Her Big Chance" of the BBC reboot of Alan Bennett's classic 1980s monologues, Talking Heads, starring Jodie Comer in the lead role. In summer 2021, she directed and co-wrote (with James Graham) the star-studded short film Rhythm of Life, encouraging people to get COVID-19 vaccines. It featured the song "The Rhythm of Life" from the 1966 classic musical, Sweet Charity, and starred Jim Broadbent, Derek Jacobi, David Walliams, Asa Butterfield, Colin Salmon, Don Warrington, Nicola Roberts, Russel Tovey and West End dancers.

Other work 
From 2012 to 2018, Rourke served as a Non-Executive Director of public service broadcaster Channel 4. Since November 2019, Rourke has been a Vice-President of the London Library, having a particular focus on developing the Library's support for emerging playwrights as part of its wider Emerging Writers Program.

Filmography

Theatre productions

References

External links 

English people of Irish descent
Living people
British theatre directors
People from Eccles, Greater Manchester
1976 births
Women theatre directors
English women film directors
English artistic directors
British artistic directors
English theatre directors
British television directors
English television directors
Alumni of New Hall, Cambridge
British women film directors